Progress M-53, identified by NASA as Progress 18P, was a Progress spacecraft used to resupply the International Space Station. It was a Progress-M 11F615A55 spacecraft, with the serial number 353.

Launch
Progress M-53 was launched by a Soyuz-U carrier rocket from Site 1/5 at the Baikonur Cosmodrome. Launch occurred at 23:09:34 UTC on 16 June 2005.

Docking
The spacecraft docked with the aft port of the Zvezda module at 00:41:31 UTC on 19 June 2005. The docking was conducted using the backup TORU system, under the control of cosmonaut Sergei Krikalev, due to a power failure at one of the spacecraft's ground control stations. It remained docked for 80 days before undocking at 10:25:57 UTC on 7 September 2005 to make way for Progress M-54. It was deorbited at 13:26:00 UTC on 7 September 2005. The spacecraft burned up in the atmosphere over the Pacific Ocean, with any remaining debris landing in the ocean at around 14:12:40 UTC.

Progress M-53 carried supplies to the International Space Station, including food, water and oxygen for the crew and equipment for conducting scientific research.

See also

 List of Progress flights
 Uncrewed spaceflights to the International Space Station

References

Spacecraft launched in 2005
Progress (spacecraft) missions
Spacecraft which reentered in 2005
Supply vehicles for the International Space Station
Spacecraft launched by Soyuz-U rockets